Neptosternus sinharajaicus is a species of beetle. Its holotype was found in Sri Lanka. The species is capable of flight, as all specimens were captured flying towards light in the evening.

Description
Body elongate, oval, less convex and more attenuated posteriorly than anteriorly. This species of Neptosternus is easily recognized by its dark appearance, and by the shape and position of its elytral yellow spots. It differs from Neptosternus starmuehlneri (Wewalka, 1973) in being longer and comparatively narrower, and in having the yellow markings less developed. It has an elongate, oval shape, more attenuated posteriorly than anteriorly and not strongly convex dorsally. Its head is dark reddish to black, fronto-clypeal region reddish, antennae yellowish; has a fine punctation and shining, reticulate surface. Its pronotum is uniformly dark reddish to black, almost impunctate, with reticulation more impressed than on the head; an anterior submarginal row of punctures is present. Ventrum reddish but the front and mid legs are yellowish.

References

External links
ITIS entry

Dytiscidae
Beetles described in 1990